is a turn-based strategy video game for the Dreamcast. It is the sequel to the Saturn title Culdcept. An enhanced version of the game, Culdcept Second Expansion, was released for the PlayStation 2 on September 26, 2002. The expansion was marketed in North America as Culdcept, and published by NEC Interchannel on December 4, 2003.

Plot 
The Goddess Culdra foresees that a powerful Cepter known as Geminigh will gain nearly infinite power, destroying all of creation. She sends Goligan, a talking cane who is her messenger, from her original world, Ruedo, to the player's world, in order to track down the Cepter who will become Geminigh and stop them. However, Goligan is unsuccessful, until he meets the player, in the form of a customized avatar. Sensing that the player has great power, Goligan teams up with them in order to track down the evil Cepter, stop them, and save the universe from destruction.

Reception 
Culdcept Second was given a high 37 out of 40 by Famitsu magazine. The expansion was given a 35 out of 40. The game has sold over 65,000 copies to date.

In North America, Culdcept Second Expansion received mixed reviews. Jeremy Dunham of IGN rated it 87/100 and gave it the Editor's Choice award, calling the game "bizarrely unique". Stating it was "incredibly fun, deceptively deep, and always entertaining", he praised the gameplay, but criticized the lack of online features or downloadable maps. He also called the game's graphics "dated", but praised the game's card art. Mike David of GameZone rated the game 8/10, calling it "incredibly addictive" and a "good solid game", but criticizing its lack of voice acting and music that "just seems to fade into the background". He called the graphics "straight off of the Sega Saturn playlist", but "classic looking", and commended the "sweet looking character models". Greg Kasavin of GameSpot rated the game 7.9/10, calling it "easily recommendable to fans of strategy games and even to fans of role-playing games", as well as "surprisingly fun and addictive". However, he also stated that "the luck-based matches will cause you some frustration from time to time".

References

External links
Culdcept Official Site (Japanese)
OmiyaSoft's Website (Japanese)
Culdcept Central (English)
Culdcept Forum (English)

2001 video games
Digital collectible card games
Culdcept
Dreamcast games
Japan-exclusive video games
Role-playing video games
Video games scored by Kenji Ito
Video games developed in Japan